Events from the year 1999 in Nepal.

Incumbents 

 Monarch: King Birendra
 Prime Minister: Girija Prasad Koirala (1998 – May 1999) and Krishna Prasad Bhattarai
 Chief Justice: Mohan Prasad Sharma (1998–1999) and Keshav Prasad Upadhyaya (from December 1999)

Events 

 May –  General elections were held from 3 to 17 May.
 5 September – Necon Air Flight 128 crashes in the west of Kathmandu.
 September and October − 8th South Asian Games were held in Kathmandu from 25 September to 4 October.
 November – ANFA League Cup is held from 20 to 30 November.
 December – Indian Airlines Flight 814 is hijacked in Indian airspace between Kathmandu, Nepal, and Delhi, India.

Births 

 27 February – Lalit Rajbanshi, cricketer
 20 May – Kajal Shrestha, cricketer
 7 July – Apsari Begam, cricketer
 3 September – Malati Rishidev, shortest woman in Nepal.
 27 November – Pratima Sherpa, golfer
 5 December – Curtis Waters, Nepali Canadian musician

Deaths 

 26 April – Man Mohan Adhikari, former Prime Minister
 4 May – Mahendra Narayan Nidhi, politician
 22 July – Arun Thapa, singer

References 

 
Nepal
Nepal
1990s in Nepal
Years of the 20th century in Nepal